Cambridge Students' Union, known as Cambridge SU, is the university-wide representative body for students at the University of Cambridge, England. Its predecessor union was known as Cambridge University Students' Union or CUSU until its dissolution in July 2020.

Cambridge SU should not be confused with the Cambridge Union Society (often referred to as simply 'the Union'); membership of both is open to all students at Cambridge, but the Cambridge Union Society is a private society, whereas all students at the University of Cambridge are automatically members of Cambridge SU (although they can opt-out), and Cambridge SU is partially funded by grants from the university.

Until 2020, Graduate students at Cambridge University were eligible for membership of CUSU as well as the University of Cambridge Graduate Union, specifically for graduate student affairs. In November 2019, students voted by referendum to dissolve both CUSU and the Graduate Union to form one student union, Cambridge SU. The new single Students' Union was established on 13 July 2020.

History
CUSU was founded as the Cambridge Students' Union (CSU) in 1971 to represent all higher education students studying in Cambridge, that is students attending the University of Cambridge plus undergraduates at CCAT (the then Cambridgeshire College of Arts and Technology, which in 1993 became Anglia Polytechnic University, Cambridge, renamed to Anglia Ruskin University in 2005). CSU also represented students at Homerton College, then a separate teacher training college in the city.

CSU during its early years from 1971 to 1974 received support from CCAT Students' Union as CCATSU was from the 1960s the only large NUS-affiliated, and conventionally funded, students' union in Cambridge. CSU in turn supported CCATSU in its campaigns to get more student housing provided for CCAT degree students, a serious issue for the college by the early 1970s. CCATSU and CSU went their separate ways after 1974.

CSU was formally recognised by the Cambridge University authorities on 25 May 1984 and renamed, following a student referendum in March 1985, as CUSU - Cambridge University Students Union. CSU's second president, in 1972, was Charles Clarke, later a Labour MP, Secretary of State for Education and Home Secretary.

There had been previous university-wide groups, such as CAMNUS (Cambridge NUS), which was founded in 1964 by Gordon Heald, John Bibby and others. CAMNUS arranged certain university-wide student facilities, such as 'CAMNUS Coaches' (an end-of-term bus service to all parts of the country), and an inter-collegiate mail service.

Following a referendum of members of CUSU and the University of Cambridge Graduate Union in 2019, the two agreed to merge. The new union, Cambridge SU, was established in July 2020.

Officers
Cambridge SU holds elections annually for 8 full-time officers, several part-time officers and a number of delegates to the National Union of Students (NUS) Annual Conference.

The full-time officers take a one-year sabbatical from their studies (or directly after they have graduated) and are:
President (PG)
President (UG)
Access, Education and Participation Officer (PG)
Access, Education and Participation Officer (UG)
Disabled Students' Officer
Welfare & Community Officer
Women's Officer
BME Officer

There are also seven SU Campaigns, which are free to differ from the central SU on policy matters, with six of which representing a particular subset of students.  They are:
 LGBT+ (Lesbian, Gay, Bisexual and Transgender)
 International Students' Campaign: international students
 Black and Minority Ethnic (BME) Campaign: Black and minority ethnic students
 Women's Campaign, known as "WomCam" 
 Disabled Students' Campaign 
 Class Act, representing students from working-class and disadvantaged educational backgrounds
 Ethical Affairs Campaign, which leads Cambridge SU's work on ethical and environmental issues in the university and wider society

The Chairs of the SU campaigns may only be elected by members of that campaign.

Controversy

In March 2006, the largest Cambridge college students' union, Trinity College Students' Union voted to disaffiliate from CUSU for the academic year 2006/2007. Several other colleges were reported to be also considering the option. Trinity College Students' Union reaffiliated in early 2007, following re-engagement work by the incumbent sabbatical officers. On 14 November 2010, both the JCR and MCR of Corpus Christi College disaffiliated, following a college-wide ballot in which 71% of undergraduates and 86% of postgraduates voted in favour of disaffiliation. Also, in November 2013 Gonville and Caius College disaffiliated following a referendum which saw a result of 213 votes for disaffiliation and 91 votes against.

In 2015 the university had to give CUSU a £100,000 bailout, but incumbent president Priscilla Mensah denied that this was due to financial mismanagement.

In 2019, CUSU presented a surplus budget, ending what the Union described as “a few difficult years in recent history” with regards to its financial situation.

Former Officers
Notable former officers and sabbaticals include:
 Charles Clarke (King's), former Labour Member of Parliament (MP) for Norwich South and Home Secretary, President 1971–72
 Mike Gapes (Fitzwilliam), former Labour and Co-operative and, subsequently, Change UK Member of Parliament (MP) for Ilford South, Secretary 1973
 Tom Hayhoe (Corpus Christi), Chairman of West London NHS Trust, President 1977–78
 David Lidington (Sidney Sussex), former Conservative Member of Parliament (MP) for Aylesbury and Chancellor of the Duchy of Lancaster, Deputy President 1977–78
 Natalie Ceeney (Newnham), senior civil servant and businessperson, President 1990–91
 Paul Lewis (King's), journalist at The Guardian, President 2002–03
 Wes Streeting (Selwyn), Labour Member of Parliament (MP) for Ilford North and former President of the National Union of Students (NUS), President 2004–05
 Mark Fletcher (Jesus), Conservative Member of Parliament (MP) for Bolsover, President 2007-09
 Lola Olufemi (Selwyn), writer and activist, Women's Officer 2017-18

References

External links
 

Students' Union
Student organizations established in 1971
Students' unions in England